Pseudanillus is a genus of ground beetles in the family Carabidae. There are about six described species in Pseudanillus.

Species
These six species belong to the genus Pseudanillus:
 Pseudanillus cephalotes Coiffait, 1969  (Morocco)
 Pseudanillus elegantulus (Normand, 1916)  (Tunisia)
 Pseudanillus laticeps (Normand, 1911)  (Tunisia)
 Pseudanillus magdalenae (Abeille de Perrin, 1894)  (Algeria and Tunisia)
 Pseudanillus marocanus (Coiffait, 1969)  (Morocco)
 Pseudanillus pastorum Zaballos & Banda, 2000  (Morocco)

References

Trechinae